The Armenian Paralympic Committee, is the National Paralympic Committee and regulating body of paralympic sports in Armenia. The headquarters of the organization is located in Yerevan.

History
The Armenian Paralympic Committee was established in 1994 and is currently led by president Hakob Abrahamyan. The organization is responsible for Armenia's participation in the summer and winter Paralympic Games and the Special Olympics. The Armenian Paralympic Committee is a full member of the International Paralympic Committee and the European Paralympic Committee. The organization also works closely with the Armenian National Disabled Sports Federation.

See also 
 Armenia at the Paralympics
 Armenian Olympic Committee
 Sport in Armenia

References

External links 
 Armenian Paralympic Committee on Facebook

Sports governing bodies in Armenia
Parasports organizations
National Paralympic Committees